Nomwaya Habib Bamogo (born 8 May 1982) is a former professional footballer who played as a deep-lying striker. Born in France, he represented Burkina Faso at international level.

Career
Born in Paris, Bamogo started his career at Ligue 2 side Montpellier. He played at the club for three seasons, in his third scoring 16 times in 38 appearances to earn himself a move to Ligue 1 giants Marseille. He played with the first team in the 2004–05 season, scoring five goals in 30 appearances, before going on loan to fellow top flight side Nantes for the following campaign. For the first half of the 2006–07 season, he moved on loan to Spanish La Liga outfit Celta Vigo, before returning in January to play again for his parent club. In August 2007, he was once again sent on loan to another French top flight side, this time local rivals Nice. In the summer of 2011, he joined Greek club Panetolikos F.C., which was recently promoted to the Greek Superleague. However, he didn't manage to score in 4 appearances, before being released.

Doncaster Rovers
On 23 December 2011, Bamogo had agreed to sign a short term contract with Doncaster Rovers. He joined the club alongside other two signings Damien Plessis and Mamadou Bagayoko on the day. However, it wasn't until 31 January 2012 that he actually made his league debut for Doncaster, starting in the club's 0–0 draw away at Hull City.

Botev Plovdiv
Bamogo joined Botev Plovdiv in October 2012. He failed to impress and was released on 22 February 2013 after just 5 games for the club in Bulgarian A Professional Football Group.

Persiram Raja Ampat
After more than a year without a club, Bamogo joined the Indonesia Soccer Championship by signing in favor of Persiram Raja Ampat in May 2014. After a first season at the club, he saw the 2015 championship abandoned at the request of the government authorities.

International career
In 2009, he made his debut for the Burkina Faso national football team.

International goals
Scores and results list Burkina Faso's goal tally first.

References

External links
 
 
 Profile on Sky Sports
 

Living people
1982 births
Footballers from Paris
French sportspeople of Burkinabé descent
Citizens of Burkina Faso through descent
Association football forwards
Burkinabé footballers
French footballers
Burkina Faso international footballers
2010 Africa Cup of Nations players
Burkinabé expatriate footballers
Expatriate footballers in Spain
Montpellier HSC players
Olympique de Marseille players
FC Nantes players
RC Celta de Vigo players
OGC Nice players
Panetolikos F.C. players
Doncaster Rovers F.C. players
Botev Plovdiv players
Persiram Raja Ampat players
INF Clairefontaine players
Ligue 1 players
Ligue 2 players
La Liga players
Super League Greece players
First Professional Football League (Bulgaria) players
Liga 1 (Indonesia) players
Expatriate footballers in Greece
Expatriate footballers in England
Expatriate footballers in Bulgaria
Expatriate footballers in Indonesia
French expatriate sportspeople in Indonesia
Burkinabé expatriate sportspeople in Spain
Burkinabé expatriate sportspeople in Greece
Burkinabé expatriate sportspeople in Bulgaria
Burkinabé expatriate sportspeople in Indonesia
21st-century Burkinabé people
Black French sportspeople